Yubileyny is a rural locality (a settlement) in Gremyachinsky Urban okrug, Perm Krai, Russia. The population was 1,275 as of 2010. There are 12 streets.

References 

Rural localities in Perm Krai